The 2018 Vuelta a Asturias was the 61st edition of the Vuelta a Asturias cycling stage race, that took place over three stages from 27 to 29 2018. The defending champion was Raúl Alarcón. Richard Carapaz (Movistar Team) won the race.

Route
The race includes three road stages on consecutive days.

Teams
A total of 15 teams will race in the 2018 Vuelta a Asturias.

Stages

Stage 1
27 April 2018 — Oviedo to Pola de Lena,

Stage 2
28 April 2018 — Soto de Ribera to Alto del Acebo,

Stage 3
29 April 2018 — Cangas del Narcea to Oviedo,

Classification leadership table

The race included four principal classifications, the leaders of which were awarded jerseys. The leader in the general classification wore a blue jersey; the leader in the points classification wore a green jersey; the leader in the mountains classification wore a white jersey, while the leader of the intermediate sprints classification wore a black and white newspaper-style jersey sponsored by La Nueva España.

Final standings

General classification

Points classification

Mountains classification

Sprints classification

Team classification

References

External links
 

2018
2018 UCI Europe Tour
2018 in Spanish road cycling